Chulak may refer to:
 Chulak-e Asali, Hamadan Province
 Chulak Qapanuri, Hamadan Province
 Chulak-e Sadeqabad, Hamadan Province
 Chulak, Ilam
 Chulak, a fictional planet in the Stargate franchise

See also
 Chulaki, Iran (disambiguation)